Strašnov is a municipality and village in Mladá Boleslav District in the Central Bohemian Region of the Czech Republic. It has about 300 inhabitants.

History
The name Strašnov was derived from the old personal Czech name Strah or Straš.

Geography
It lies in a flat landscape of the Jizera Table.

History
The first written mention of Strašnov is from 1297. There used to be a fortress, which protected a trade route leading through Strašnov. Most of the territory of Strašnov belonged to the Stránov estate.

Transport
The D10 motorway runs along the western municipal border.

References

External links

Villages in Mladá Boleslav District